Leon Vlok (3 March 1929 – 8 November 2015) was a South African cricketer. He played twelve first-class matches for North Eastern Transvaal between 1950 and 1953.

References

External links
 

1929 births
2015 deaths
South African cricketers
Northerns cricketers
Cricketers from Pretoria